Richard Stockton may refer to:

Richard Stockton (Continental Congressman) (1730–1781), delegate to the Continental Congress from New Jersey
Richard Stockton (U.S. senator) (1764–1828), United States senator from New Jersey and son of the New Jersey delegate to the Continental Congress
Richard Stockton (playwright) (1932–1997), American playwright
Dick Stockton (born 1942), American sportscaster, born Richard Edward Stokvis
Dick Stockton (tennis) (born 1951), American tennis player 
Richard Stockton (Mississippi politician), Associate Justice of the Supreme Court of Mississippi

See also
Richard Stockton College, New Jersey, U.S.A.